South Norfolk by-election may refer to one of three by-elections held for the British House of Commons constituency of South Norfolk:

 1898 South Norfolk by-election
 1920 South Norfolk by-election
 1955 South Norfolk by-election

See also
 List of United Kingdom by-elections
 South Norfolk constituency